The men's light flyweight boxing competition at the 2012 Olympic Games in London was held from 31 July to 12 August at the ExCeL Exhibition Centre.

Competition format
Like all Olympic boxing events, the competition was a straight single-elimination tournament. This event consisted of 26 boxers who have qualified for the competition through various qualifying tournaments held in 2011 and 2012. The competition began with a preliminary round on 31 July, where the number of competitors was reduced to 16, and concluded with the final on 11 August. As there were fewer than 32 boxers in the competition, a number of boxers received a bye through the preliminary round. Both semi-final losers were awarded bronze medals.

All bouts consisted of three three-minute rounds. The boxers receive points for every successful punch they land on their opponent's head or upper body. The boxer with the most points at the end of the bouts wins. If a boxer is knocked to the ground and cannot get up before the referee counts to 10 then the bout is over and the opponent wins.

Schedule 
All times are British Summer Time (UTC+1)

Results

Finals

Top half

Bottom half

References

Boxing at the 2012 Summer Olympics
Men's events at the 2012 Summer Olympics